Francesca Martinelli (born 13 March 1971) is an Italian ski mountaineer.

Martinelli was born in Milan. She started ski mountaineering in 1980 and competed first in the Gara dell'Adamello race in 2003. Two years after she became a member of the Italian national team.

Selected results 
 2004:
 1st, World Championship team race (together with Cristina Favre-Moretti)
 2nd, Sellaronda Skimarathon (together with Roberta Pedranzini)
 2005:
 2nd, European Championship relay race (together with Gloriana Pellissier and Christiane Nex)
 6th, European Championship vertical race
 6th, European Championship single race
 7th, European Championship team race (together with Astrid Renzler)
 2006:
 1st, World Championship team race (together with Roberta Pedranzini)
 1st, World Championship relay race (together with Chiara Raso, Roberta Pedranzini and Gloriana Pellissier)
 1st, Tour du Rutor (together with Roberta Pedranzini)
 2007:
 1st, European Championship team race (together with Roberta Pedranzini)
 1st, European Championship relay race (together with Gloriana Pellissier and Roberta Pedranzini)
 1st, Mountain Attack race
 1st, Sellaronda Skimarathon (together with Roberta Pedranzini)
 2nd, European Championship combination ranking
 4th, European Championship single race
 9th, European Championship vertical race
 2008:
 1st, World Championship long distance race
 1st, World Championship team race (together with Roberta Pedranzini)
 1st, Mountain Attack race
 1st, Dolomiti Cup team (together with Roberta Pedranzini)
 2nd, World Championship vertical race
 2nd, World Championship combination ranking
 2nd, World Championship relay race (together with Gloriana Pellissier, Roberta Pedranzini and Elisa Fleischmann)
 3rd, World Championship single race
 2009:
 1st, European Championship team race (together with Roberta Pedranzini)
 1st, European Championship relay race (together with Gloriana Pellissier and Roberta Pedranzini)
 1st, Tour du Rutor (together with Roberta Pedranzini)
 1st, Mountain Attack race
 2nd, European Championship single race
 2nd, European Championship combination ranking
 3rd, European Championship vertical race
 3rd, Dachstein Xtreme
 2010:
 1st, World Championship relay race (together with Silvia Rocca and Roberta Pedranzini)
 1st, World Championship team race (together with Roberta Pedranzini)
 2nd, World Championship combination ranking
 3rd, World Championship vertical race
 3rd, World Championship single race
 2011:
 2nd, World Championship team race (together with Roberta Pedranzini)
 1st and course record, Sellaronda Skimarathon (together with Roberta Pedranzini)

Pierra Menta 

 2006: 1st, together with Roberta Pedranzini
 2007: 1st, together with Roberta Pedranzini
 2008: 2nd, together with Roberta Pedranzini
 2009: 1st, together with Roberta Pedranzini
 2010: 1st, together with Roberta Pedranzini
 2011: 2nd, together with Roberta Pedranzini
 2012: 1st, together with Roberta Pedranzini

Trofeo Mezzalama 

 2007: 1st, together with Gloriana Pellissier and Roberta Pedranzini
 2009: 1st, together with Laëtitia Roux and Roberta Pedranzini
 2011: 1st, together with Roberta Pedranzini and Gloriana Pellissier

Patrouille des Glaciers 

 2010: 2nd, together with Roberta Pedranzini and Silvia Rocca

External links 

 Francesca Martinelli at skimountaineering.org

References 

1971 births
Living people
Italian female ski mountaineers
World ski mountaineering champions
Alpine skiers from Milan